Yaba Cemetery is situated in Yaba, an eastern suburb of Lagos, Nigeria. It is a civil cemetery known locally as Atan Cemetery.

The cemetery contains the largest concentration of World War II era war graves in Nigeria.

References

External links
  Commonwealth War Graves Commission
 

Geography of Lagos
Cemeteries in Lagos